Lee County High School is a public school located in Leesburg, Georgia, United States. The mascot is the Trojan and the school colors are red and black.

LCHS has achieved Adequate Yearly Progress for seven years in a row and is part of the Lee County School District, which is one of only a few school systems in the state of Georgia to earn AYP for six years in a row.

Kevin Dowling served as the principal of the school from June 2006 to Fall 2016.

Karen Hancock took over from Kevin Dowling as principal in the fall of 2016.

In 2008 the Lee County High School 9th Grade Campus was opened, which freshmen attend for one year before transitioning to the upper campus. The principal of the LCHS 9th Grade Campus is Ginger Lawrence.

Academics
The school offers a wide variety of classes and career pathway opportunities. In addition to its academic commitment, the school has been recognized for its outstanding leaders. Principal Kevin Dowling was named the 2012 Georgia Principal of the Year. In 2010, LCHS was listed by Newsweek as one of "America's Best High Schools".

AP and Honors courses
The school offers several Advanced Placement and Honors classes. While the AP classes change year by year, the school typically offers AP Calculus AB, AP English Language and Composition, AP English Literature and Composition, AP Music Theory, AP Physics B, AP Psychology, AP Statistics, AP US History, and AP World History. The school also offers AP Human Geography at the 9th Grade Campus.

Extracurricular activities
Students can spend their out-of-class time in the following extracurricular activities.

Athletics 

Football
Boys'/girls' soccer 
Boys'/girls' cross country
Boys'/girls' track
Boys'/girls' basketball
Boys'/girls' tennis
Boys'/girls' golf
Baseball
Softball
Swim team
Wrestling
Girls' volleyball
Cheerleading (competition, football, and basketball)
Marching band color guard
Marching band drumline
NJROTC color guard
NJROTC Drill team
NJROTC Rifle team
NJROTC Orentering team

Fine arts
Theatre arts: The school competes in the annual One Act Play competition. The drama department produces five plays each year, including musicals. Most of the plays are performed in the school's Robert A. Clay Auditorium.

Band: The Lee County High School Band Program includes a marching band, two concert bands, and a jazz ensemble.

Publications and broadcasting
The school newspaper is The Panoptic. The Trojan Yearbook is published every year.

Speech and debate
The school has a highly successful speech and debate program that competes in competitions across Georgia and the nation. The team has advanced competitors to the National Forensic League Speech and Debate Tournament every year since 2008 and the National Catholic Forensic League Grand National Tournament every year since 2009. At the 2013 Georgia Forensic Coaches Association (GFCA) Varsity State Championship, the team won the President's Cup, an award given to the school with the most cumulative rounds in the state tournament, as well as the third place overall sweepstakes award. The team has seen its competitors advance to octofinal, quarterfinal, semifinal, and even final rounds at Wake Forest University, University of Florida, Emory University, Duke University, the Tournament of Champions, the Grand National Tournament and the National Speech and Debate Tournament. The school is chartered with the National Forensic League, the National Catholic Forensic League and the GFCA.

Official GHSA State Titles
Boys' Basketball (1) - 1985(3A) 
Football (2) - 2017(6A), 2018(6A)

Other GHSA State Titles
Literary (4) - 1978(A), 1988(2A), 1998(3A), 1999(3A) 
One Act Play (3) - 1999(3A), 2000(5A), 2015(6A)

Notable alumni
 Luke Bryan - country music singer and songwriter
 Tory Carter, NFL player for the Tennessee Titans
 Phillip Phillips - winner of the eleventh season of American Idol
 Buster Posey - 2010 MLB Rookie of the Year, first round draft pick of the San Francisco Giants, former catcher for the Florida State Seminoles baseball team
 D'Vontrey Richardson - former two-sport athlete at Florida State University. Minor league baseball player within the Milwaukee Brewers organization.

References

External links
 School website

Public high schools in Georgia (U.S. state)
Schools in Lee County, Georgia